The 1801 United States Senate election in New York was held on January 27, 1801, by the New York State Legislature to elect a U.S. Senator (Class 3) to represent the State of New York in the United States Senate.

Background
John Armstrong had been elected in November 1800 to fill the vacancy of this seat, and had taken his seat on January 8, 1801.

At the State election in April 1800, a Democratic-Republican majority of 28 was elected to the Assembly, but the Senate had a majority of 7 Federalists. The 24th New York State Legislature met from November 4 to 7, 1800; and from January 27 to April 8, 1801, at Albany, New York.

Candidates
The incumbent U.S. Senator John Armstrong ran for re-election as the candidate of the Democratic-Republican Party.

Result
The incumbent Armstrong was re-elected. Votes were not recorded.

Aftermath
Armstrong resigned on February 5, 1802, to make place for DeWitt Clinton who was elected by the State Legislature in a special election to fill the vacancy.

Sources
The New York Civil List compiled in 1858 (see: pg. 62f for U.S. Senators; pg. 117f for State Senators 1800-01; page 174 for Members of Assembly 1800-01)
Members of the 7th United States Congress
The Documentary History of the First Federal Elections, 1788-1790 by Merrill Jensen & Robert A. Becker (Vol. 2; page 412)

1801
New York
United States Senate
January 1801 events
1801